Meiotic recombination protein DMC1/LIM15 homolog is a protein that in humans is encoded by the DMC1 gene.

Meiotic recombination protein Dmc1 is a homolog of the bacterial strand exchange protein RecA. Dmc1 plays the central role in homologous recombination in meiosis by assembling at the sites of programmed DNA double strand breaks and carrying out a search for allelic DNA sequences located on homologous chromatids. The name "Dmc" stands for "disrupted meiotic cDNA" and refers to the method used for its discovery which involved using clones from a meiosis-specific cDNA library to direct knock-out mutations of abundantly expressed meiotic genes. The Dmc1 protein is one of two homologs of RecA found in eukaryotic cells, the other being Rad51. In budding yeast, Rad51 serves as a strand exchange protein in mitosis where it is critical for the repair of DNA breaks. Rad51 is converted to an accessory factor for Dmc1 during meiosis by inhibition of its strand exchange activity.   Homologs of DMC1 have been identified in many organisms including divergent fungi, plants and mammals including humans.

Discovery 

The DMC1 gene and protein were discovered in the budding yeast S. cerevisiae by Douglas Bishop when he was a postdoctoral fellow in the laboratory of Nancy Kleckner at Harvard University.

Function 

The protein encoded by this gene is essential for meiotic homologous recombination. Genetic recombination in meiosis plays an important role in generating diversity of genetic information and facilitates the reductional segregation of chromosomes that must occur for formation of gametes during sexual reproduction.

Like other members of the Rad51/RecA family, Dmc1 stabilizes strand exchange intermediates (Rad1/RecA-stretched DNA, or RS-DNA) in stretched triplets similar to B form DNA.  Each molecule of the protein binds a triplet of nucleotides, and the strength of that binding, as assessed by the change in Gibbs free energy, can be assessed by the length of time that a labelled dsDNA probe with a short homologous sequence remains bound to a DNA containing a short region of homology to it.  A study of this type has shown that a mismatch in any of the three positions at the end of a stretch of homology will not increase the length of time that the probe remains bound, and in Rad51 or RecA constructs an internal mismatch will cause a similar reduction in binding time.  All of the enzymes are capable of "stepping over" a mismatch and continuing to bind the probe more firmly if a longer region of homology exists.  However, with Dmc1 a triplet with a single internal (but not terminal) mismatch will contribute to the stability of probe binding to a similar extent as one without a mismatch.  In this way, Dmc1 is specially suited to its role as a meiosis-specific recombinase, as this activity permits it more effectively to catalyze recombination between sequences that are not perfectly matched.

Interactions 

DMC1 (gene) has been shown to interact with RAD51. The protein has also been shown to bind Tid1(Rdh54), Mei5/Sae3, and Hop2/Mnd1. All of these interacting proteins act to enhance Dmc1's activity in purified systems and are also implicated as being required for Dmc1 function in cells.

Rad51 interaction with Dmc1

During meiosis, the two recombinases, Rad51 and Dmc1, interact with single-stranded DNA to form specialized filaments that are adapted for facilitating recombination between homologous chromosomes.  Both Dmc1 and Rad51 have an intrinsic ability to self-aggregate.  The presence of Rad51 filaments stabilizes adjacent Dmc1 filaments and conversely Dmc1 stabilizes adjacent Rad51 filaments.  A model was proposed in which Dmc1 and Rad51 form separate filaments on the same single stranded DNA and cross-talk between the two recombinases affects their biochemical properties.

During meiosis, even in the absence of Rad51 strand exchange activity, Dmc1 appears to be able to repair all meiotic DNA breaks, and this absence does not affect meiotic crossing over rates.

References

Further reading 

 
 
 
 
 
 
 
 
 
 
 
 

Genes on human chromosome 22